The Oklahoma State Budget for Fiscal Year 2009, was a spending request by Governor Brad Henry to fund government operations for July 1, 2008–June 30, 2009. Governor Henry and the Legislature approved the budget in May 2008.

Figures shown in the spending request do not reflect the actual appropriations for Fiscal Year 2009, which must be authorized by the Legislature.

Key funding issues
The Governor's budget identified the following key funding issues:
Annualizations - $67 million increase in base agency budgets to replace one-time funding
Education - $200 million additional funding
Common Education
$65 million to implement $1,200/annual teacher pay raise
$17 million to fund increased employer contributions to the Oklahoma Teachers' Retirement System
$10 million in additional State Aid to local school districts
$4 million for standardized testing remediation
$3 million for Sooner Start
$2.5 million for high school graduation coaches
$1.5 million for math labs
$31.6 million to replace one-time funding
Career Technology Education
$3.1 million to implement teacher pay raise
$1.2 million to fund increased employer contributions to the Oklahoma Teachers' Retirement System
$1 million in additional State Aid
$1 million to purchase Altus Municipal Airport
$1.4 million to replace one-time funding
Higher Education
$13 million to fund increased employer contributions to the Oklahoma Teachers' Retirement System
$22.8 million to replace one-time funding
Health Care
$50.4 million to replace Federal funding for Medicare Part A and B
$22 million to replace one-time funding
$17.7 million to cover costs associated with increase Medicaid enrollment
$2.5 million for "Money Follows the Person" program
$250,000 for fiscal agent contract increases
Safety and Security
$32.4 million to the Oklahoma Department of Corrections to address 2.7% inmate population growth
$1.3 million to Office of the Oklahoma Attorney General for Domestic Violence Unit
Human Services - $20.7 million to replace Federal funding from the Federal Medicare Assistance percentage
Capital Budget Proposal - The Governor proposed a $189 million bond issue to cover cost associated with constructing new state buildings and other projects:
Disaster Recovery - $46 million
Supreme Court Building - $11 million
Native American Cultural Museum - $45 million
Urban Education Centers - $62 million
Office of Juvenile Affairs Offender Facility - $20 million
Office of Juvenile Affairs Detention Centers - $4.9 million

Total revenue
All revenue for Fiscal Year 2008 was $7.3 billion.

Total spending
The Governor's budget for Fiscal Year 2009 totaled $7.3 billion in spending, an increase of 6% from Fiscal Year 2008 enacted levels of $6.9 billion. Percentages in parentheses indicate percentage change compared to 2008 enacted levels. The budget request is broken down by the following expenditures:
$41.1 million - Fiscal Year 2008 Supplementals
Appropriations by Cabinet Department: $7.3 billion (+6%)
$3.9 billion - Education (+5%)
$1.2 billion - Health (+10%)
$781 million - Human Services (+4%)
$744 million - Safety and Security (+8%)
$221 million - Transportation (+1%)
$108 million - Finance and Revenue (+2%)
$86.8 million - Judiciary (+1%)
$82.0 million - Commerce and Tourism (+6%)
$42.9 million - Agriculture (+0%)
$41.7 million - Veterans Affairs (+4%)
$38.3 million - Legislature (-1%)
$34.5 million - Science and Technology (+54%)
$26.9 million - Human Resources and Administration (-4%)
$13.8 million - Energy (+5%)
$17.5 million - Environment (+6%)
$13.4 million - Military (-2%)
$8.5 million - Secretary of State (-6%)
$3.4 million - Governor and Lieutenant Governor (+2%)

Total appropriations
The Oklahoma Legislature approved total appropriations for fiscal year 2008 of $6.9 billion. Percentages in parentheses indicate percentage change compared to the Governor's budget. The final appropriations are broken down by the following expenditures:
Appropriations by Cabinet Department: $7.1 billion (-3%)
$3.8 billion - Education (-3%)
$1.1 billion - Health (-8%)
$758 million - Human Services (-3%)
$733 million - Safety and Security (-1%)
$208 million - Transportation (-6%)
$94.9 million - Commerce and Tourism (+15%)
$92.5 million - Finance and Revenue (-14%)
$86.0 million - Judiciary (-1%)
$44.8 million - Agriculture (+4%)
$40.3 million - Veterans Affairs (-3%)
$39.4 million - Legislature (+3%)
$27.6 million - Human Resources and Administration (+3%)
$22.5 million - Science and Technology (-35%)
$16.5 million - Environment (-6%)
$13.4 million - Energy (-3%)
$13.1 million - Military (-2%)
$8.1 million - Secretary of State (-5%)
$3.4 million - Governor and Lieutenant Governor (+0%)

References

External links
Oklahoma Office of State Finance official website
Fiscal Year 2009 Budget

 
2009 in Oklahoma
Oklahoma state budget